The 2012–13 season of Marseille will be the club's 63rd season in the Ligue 1 and this year they will be challenging for four titles: Ligue 1, UEFA Europa League, Coupe de France and Coupe de la Ligue.

Transfers

In

Total spending:  €3,200,000

Out

Total income:  €24,500,000

Kits
Marseille's home kit features the traditional white / turquoise blend with orange trims.  The away kit features a retro style, with one of the club's older badges and French tricolor on collar and sleeves.  The third kit is an inversion of the club's home colours, providing an intimidating black-orange look.

Squad statistics
As of June 2012

Competitions

Legend

Pre-season

Ligue 1

League table

Results summary

Results by round

Matches

Coupe de France

Coupe de la Ligue

UEFA Europa League

Qualifying phase

Third qualifying round

Play-off round

Group stage

Group C

Statistics

Overall

Goals

Sponsorship
 Intersport
 Adidas
 Groupama
 Citroën
 PMU
 Crédit Agricole

Notes

References

Olympique de Marseille seasons
Marseille
Olympique de Marseille